The 2007 Castle Point Borough Council election took place on 3 May 2007 to elect members of Castle Point Borough Council in Essex, England. One third of the council was up for election and the Conservative party stayed in overall control of the council.

After the election, the composition of the council was
Conservative 26
Canvey Island Independent Party 15

Election result
The Conservatives remained in control of the council with 26 councillors, but lost 3 seats to the Canvey Island Independent Party. The Conservatives held all 8 seats in Benfleet, Hadleigh and Thundersley, but won only 1 of the 6 seats on Canvey Island. On Canvey Island the Canvey Island Independent Party took the other 5 seats to have 15 councillors, gaining 3 from the Conservatives, as well as defeating the only Labour councillor on the council.

Ward results

By-elections between 2007 and 2008
Two by-elections were held in St Marys ward on 20 December 2007 after the resignation of Conservative councillors Alan and Kate Meager. One seat was held for the Conservatives by Alf Partridge with 509 votes, while the other seat was gained for Labour by Brian Wilson with 480 votes.

References

Castle Point Borough Council elections
2007 English local elections
2000s in Essex